Kathryn Gray is a Welsh poet.

Biography
Kathryn Gray was born in Wales in 1973 and grew up in Swansea. She studied German and Medieval Studies and at the University of Bristol.

Gray's first poetry collection, Never—Never, was published in 2004 by Seren Books. She was shortlisted for the T.S. Eliot Prize and the Forward Prize for best first collection for her work.

Gray published the poetry pamphlet, Flowers in 2017. Her work has appeared in several literary journals, including the Times Literary Supplement, the Independent, the Poetry Review and Poetry Wales.

Gray has taught poetry at the Poetry School, London and the Arvon Foundation. She is a director of Literature Wales. She was editor of New Welsh Review for three years. She  currently works for a literary research project, funded by the Leverhulme Trust, investigating Welsh poetry in English since 1997, Devolved Voices. Gray lives in London.

Poetry
Never—Never, Seren Books, (2004)
 Flowers, (2017)

Awards
 (2001) Eric Gregory Award
 (2004) Shortlisted for the Forward Prize for best first collection, (2004)
 (2004) Shortlisted for the T.S. Eliot Prize

References

1973 births
Living people
21st-century Welsh women writers
21st-century Welsh writers
21st-century Welsh poets
People from Swansea
Alumni of the University of Bristol